Khosrow Sinai (19 January 1941 – 1 August,  2020) was an Iranian film director, screenwriter, composer, poet and scholar.

Sinai's work was influenced by documentaries and focused on social and artistic subjects. "Bride of Fire" is among his best known movies, and has won multiple awards in both domestic and international film festivals. He was the first Iranian film director to win an international prize after the 1979 revolution and has been awarded the Knight's Cross of the Order of Merit of the Republic of Poland.

Biography 
Khosrow Sinai was born on 19 January 1941 in Sari, Mazandaran Province in north of Iran. He graduated in 1958 from Alborz High School in Tehran, and then went to Austria for further education. He spent four years studying Architecture at the Vienna University of Technology and three years study in music composition at the Vienna Academy of Music and Dramatic Arts. He graduated in music education from the Vienna Music Conservatory. Finally he graduated as cinema and television director (main study) and screenplay writing (subsidiary study) from Vienna Academy of Music and Dramatic Arts (with honors).

After these years of study he returned to Iran in 1967 and worked in the Ministry of Culture and Arts (till 1972), and as instructor in various universities in the fields of screenplay writing and documentary film until 1992.

He also worked in National Iranian Television (now called Seda o Sima) as producer, screenplay writer, director, and editor making about 100 short films, documentaries, and features. He is best known for his Avant-garde documentaries and also his unique style in docu-drama. He has been a juror in several national and foreign film festivals.

Though Sinai is mostly known for his films, he was also a skilful composer and accordion virtuoso, and had composed soundtracks for some of his own films.

Filmography 
"Arus-e Atash", (The Bride of Fire) was one of his most successful films in box office and won the people's choice award, and best screenplay at the 18th Fajr Film Festival. In addition, Sinai won a Crystal Globe at the Karlovy Vary International Film Festival.

Published books and screenplays 
The Man in White
The Artists of a Bloodshedding Era
The Bride of Fire (Film Script)
The Post-communist Cinema (translated from English).
The Lost Requiem
Muds Blisters, poetry collection (1963)
Translation from German: My Journey and Adventures in Iran, a book by Ármin Vámbéry (1863).

He has also written and translated numerous essays about cinema and other fine arts.

Personal life 
Sinai married the Hungarian painter, Gizella Varga Sinai, and Iranian painter Farah Ossouli. His three daughters are artists, and his one son is a scientist.

On 1 August 2020, Sinai died at the age of 79 from COVID-19 during the COVID-19 pandemic in Iran.

See also 
 Cinema of Iran

References

External links 
 
Michaël Abescassis, Impressions of an Auteur, Tehran Today: Talking with Iranian Director Khosrow Sinai, Bright Lights Film Journal, May 2009, .
 Ryszard Antolak, The Lost Requiem of Khosrow Sinai, Persian Journal, 25 November 2007, .The Lost Requiem: Khosrow Sinai's priceless Iranian and Polish historical document, The Iranian, 26 November 2007, .
 Khosrow Sinai, The passing of the Polish through Iran (Gozar-e Lahestāni-hā az Iran), in Persian, Jadid Online, 28 May 2009, (Persian),  (English). An audio slideshow by Shokā Sahrā'i (with English subtitles):  (7 min 46 sec).
 An extended interview with Kh. Sinai, his biography, list of books, in Persian (artebox.ir)

1941 births
2020 deaths
Iranian film directors
Alborz High School alumni
TU Wien alumni
People from Mazandaran Province
People from Sari, Iran
Crystal Simorgh for Best Director winners
Crystal Simorgh for Best Screenplay winners
Iranian expatriates in Austria
Deaths from the COVID-19 pandemic in Iran